Rawo is a Papuan language in the Skou family, spoken on the north coast of Papua New Guinea in the vicinity of the village of Leitre (Laitre) in Bewani/Wutung Onei Rural LLG, Sandaun Province.

The language of Leitre itself is more closely related to Vanimo. Although Rawo and Leitre are both in the Skou family, they are in different branches of the family.

References

Languages of Sandaun Province
Serra Hills languages